Juan María Maury (1772–1845) was a Spanish writer.

Spanish male writers
1772 births
1845 deaths